Live at the Marquee is a live album by the British glam rock band Girl, recorded in 1981 and released in 2001. The album is included as the bonus disc of the 2016 Rock Candy Records re-issue of Girl's 1982 album Wasted Youth.

Track listing
"Ice in My Blood" - 3:23
"Icey Blue" - 3:24
"Mad for It" - 3:59
"Overnight Angels" - 4:48
"Old Dogs" - 3:27
"Big Night" - 4:34
"Sweet Kids" - 2:34
"Wasted Youth" - 3:39
"Nice 'n' Nasty" - 3:04
"My Number" - 4:18
"Standard Romance" - 4:09
"Thru the Twilight" - 3:26

Personnel
Phil Lewis - lead vocals
Phil Collen - guitar
Gerry Laffy - guitar
Simon Laffy - bass
Pete Barnacle - drums

References

Girl (band) albums
2001 live albums
Live albums recorded at The Marquee Club